The 2014 Citi Open (known as such for sponsorship reasons) was a tennis tournament played on outdoor hard courts. It was the 46th edition (for the men) and the 4th edition (for the women) of the event known this year as the Citi Open, and was part of the ATP World Tour 500 series of the 2014 ATP World Tour, and of the WTA International tournaments of the 2014 WTA Tour. It took place at the William H.G. FitzGerald Tennis Center in Washington, D.C., United States, from July 26 to August 3, 2014.

Points and prize money

Point distribution

Prize money 

1 Qualifiers prize money is also the Round of 64 prize money
* per team

ATP singles main-draw entrants

Seeds

1 Rankings are as of July 21, 2014

Other entrants
The following players received wild cards into the main singles draw:
  Tomáš Berdych
  James Duckworth
  Filip Peliwo
  Francis Tiafoe

The following players received entry from the singles qualifying draw:
  Jared Donaldson
  Robby Ginepri
  Alex Kuznetsov
  Illya Marchenko
  Rajeev Ram
  Yūichi Sugita

The following player received entry as a lucky loser:
  Sam Groth

Withdrawals
Before the tournament
  Grigor Dimitrov → replaced by  Sam Groth
  Ivan Dodig → replaced by  Tim Smyczek
  Matthew Ebden → replaced by  Malek Jaziri
  Bradley Klahn → replaced by  Michael Berrer
  Gaël Monfils (knee injury) → replaced by  Dudi Sela
  Dmitry Tursunov → replaced by  Frank Dancevic

ATP doubles main-draw entrants

Seeds

1 Rankings are as of July 21, 2014

Other entrants
The following pairs received wildcards into the doubles main draw:
  Jared Donaldson /  Stefan Kozlov 
  Steve Johnson  /  Sam Querrey

The following pair received entry from the doubles qualifying draw:
  Jonathan Erlich /  Rajeev Ram

WTA singles main-draw entrants

Seeds

1 Rankings are as of July 21, 2014

Other entrants
The following players received wild cards into the main singles draw:
  Françoise Abanda
  Shelby Rogers

The following players received entry from the singles qualifying draw:
  Tornado Alicia Black 
  Hiroko Kuwata 
  Olivia Rogowska
  Taylor Townsend

Withdrawals
Before the tournament
  Eugenie Bouchard → replaced by  Kiki Bertens
  Jana Čepelová → replaced by  Vania King
  Monica Niculescu → replaced by  Virginie Razzano

During the tournament
  Vania King (right hip injury)

Retirements
  Zarina Diyas

WTA doubles main-draw entrants

Seeds

1 Rankings are as of July 21, 2014

Other entrants
The following pair received a wildcard into the doubles main draw:
  Roxanne Ellison  /  Sierra Ellison

Withdrawals
During the tournament
  Vania King (right hip injury)

Champions

Men's singles

  Milos Raonic def.  Vasek Pospisil, 6–1, 6–4

Women's singles

  Svetlana Kuznetsova def.  Kurumi Nara, 6–3, 4–6, 6–4

Men's doubles

  Jean-Julien Rojer /  Horia Tecău def.  Sam Groth /  Leander Paes, 7–5, 6–4

Women's doubles

   Shuko Aoyama /  Gabriela Dabrowski def.  Hiroko Kuwata /  Kurumi Nara, 6–1, 6–2

References

External links
Official website

Citi Open
Citi Open
Washington Open (tennis)
Citi Open
Citi Open
Citi Open